Points...: Interviews, 1974–1994 is a 1995 book collecting interviews by the French philosopher Jacques Derrida. It contains the translation of all the interview of the 1992 French edition, plus two additional interviews, Honoris Causa (on Cambridge granting him the honorary doctorate) and "The Work of Intellectuals and the Press".

1992 non-fiction books
1995 non-fiction books
Books of interviews
Philosophy books
Works by Jacques Derrida